Carex atlantica, the prickly bog sedge, is a species of flowering plant in the family Cyperaceae, native to eastern North America, and eastern Hispaniola. It is usually found growing in bogs or acidic seeps.

Subtaxa
The following subspecies are currently accepted:
Carex atlantica subsp. atlantica – Entire range, except Ontario, Québec, Vermont, and the Dominican Republic
Carex atlantica subsp. capillacea  – Entire range, except West Virginia

References

atlantica
Flora of Ontario
Flora of Quebec
Flora of Nova Scotia
Flora of Illinois
Flora of Missouri
Flora of the Northeastern United States
Flora of Texas
Flora of the Southeastern United States
Flora of the Dominican Republic
Plants described in 1893
Flora without expected TNC conservation status
Taxa named by Liberty Hyde Bailey